Nickenson Stephan Paul (born 25 August 1997) is an Aruban footballer who plays as a defender for AO Poros and the Aruba national football team.

Career

Club career
Paul started his career with SV Dakota, where he helped the club to win Aruban Division di Honor twice in 2018 and 2022. He transferred to AO Poros in 2022.

International career
Paul made his senior international debut on 30 March 2014, coming on as an 89th-minute substitute for Denzel Dumfries in a 2–0 friendly victory over Guam.

Career statistics

International

References

External links

1996 births
Living people
SV Dakota players
Aruban footballers
Aruba international footballers
Association football defenders
People from Oranjestad, Aruba
Aruba under-20 international footballers
Aruba youth international footballers
2015 CONCACAF U-20 Championship players